Sharp HealthCare is a not-for-profit regional health care group located in San Diego. Sharp includes four acute care hospitals, three specialty hospitals, three affiliated medical groups, and a health plan. Sharp has approximately 2,600 physicians, and more than 18,000 employees.

History

The first Sharp hospital opened in 1955, as Donald N. Sharp Memorial Community Hospital, a nonprofit facility in San Diego. Funding for the facility began in 1950, with a donation of $500,000 from a local rancher and radio communications pioneer, Thomas E. Sharp. This donation was made in memory of his son, US Army Air Corps Lt. Donald N. Sharp, who had been killed during World War II. By 1952, more than $2.5 million had been donated by 1,300 individuals, families, and businesses. The groundbreaking for Donald N. Sharp Memorial Community Hospital took place in 1953.

Locations

Sharp HealthCare includes four acute care hospitals, three specialty hospitals, three medical groups and a health plan.

Acute care Hospitals

Sharp Chula Vista Medical Center

Affiliated with Sharp HealthCare since 1989, Sharp Chula Vista Medical Center is located in Chula Vista. It has 449 licensed beds, including 100 skilled nursing beds and 9 neonatal intensive care beds.

The cancer treatment program at Sharp Chula Vista is certified by the American College of Surgeons Commission on Cancer, as a Comprehensive Community Cancer Center. The breast cancer treatment program at Sharp Chula Vista is accredited by the National Accreditation Program for Breast Centers.

Sharp Coronado Hospital
Sharp Coronado Hospital has been affiliated with Sharp HealthCare since 1994. Located in Coronado, the facility holds 181 licensed beds, 122 of which are skilled nursing beds, and 59 of which are acute care beds. Sharp Coronado Hospital was the first Planetree Alliance hospital in San Diego County and, as such, focuses on patient empowerment, patient and family education and complementary therapies, including therapeutic touch, clinical aromatherapy, acupuncture and massage therapy.

Sharp Grossmont Hospital
Located in La Mesa, California, Sharp Grossmont Hospital affiliated with Sharp HealthCare in 1991. Sharp Grossmont Hospital holds 524 licensed beds, 24 of which are neonatal intensive care beds.

Sharp Grossmont Hospital is recognized in 2022 by the American Nurses Credentialing Center (ANCC) as a Magnet Hospital for excellence in patient care and nursing practices.

The cancer treatment program at Sharp Grossmont is certified by the American College of Surgeons Commission on Cancer as a Comprehensive Community Cancer Center. The breast cancer treatment program at Sharp Grossmont is accredited by the National Accreditation Program for Breast Centers.

Sharp Memorial Hospital
Opened in 1955, Sharp Memorial Hospital is Sharp's largest hospital and the system's only designated Level II trauma center. Located in Birdland/Serra Mesa, the hospital has 656 licensed beds. Sharp Memorial Hospital is home to a large Emergency and Trauma center; a surgery center; many specialized medical programs and departments.

In January 2012, Sharp Memorial was formally designated as a Planetree Designated Patient-Centered Hospital, joining Sharp Coronado as the only other hospital in California to receive the designation. In January 2008, Sharp Memorial became the second Sharp hospital to receive the American Nurses Credentialing Center Magnet recognition for nursing excellence, making Sharp HealthCare the first health system in California with two Magnet-designated hospitals.

The cancer treatment program at Sharp Memorial is certified by the American College of Surgeons Commission on Cancer as a Comprehensive Community Cancer Center. The breast cancer treatment program at Sharp Memorial is accredited by the National Accreditation Program for Breast Centers.

Specialty hospitals

Sharp Mary Birch Hospital for Women & Newborns
Opened in 1992, Sharp Mary Birch Hospital for Women & Newborns is one of the first freestanding women's hospitals in the nation. More than 9,400 babies are born at Sharp Mary Birch each year, more than any other hospital in California. The hospital holds 206 beds, 84 of which are neonatal intensive care unit (NICU) beds.

Sharp Mary Birch has been designated a "Center of Excellence in Minimally Invasive Gynecologic Surgery" by the American Academy of Gynecologic Laparoscopists.

Sharp Mesa Vista Hospital
Sharp Mesa Vista Hospital is the largest privately operated psychiatric hospital and premier provider of psychiatric and chemical dependency services in San Diego County. Sharp Mesa Vista joined Sharp in 1998, and currently holds 158 licensed and 154 maintained psychiatric beds.

Sharp McDonald Center
Sharp McDonald Center provides treatment for adults and their families, the only medically supervised chemical dependency recovery hospital in San Diego County to do so. The hospital became affiliated with Sharp HealthCare in 1998 and has 17 licensed beds.

Medical groups

SharpCare Medical Group
SharpCare Medical Group provides care for patients in San Diego.

Sharp Community Medical Group
Sharp Community Medical Group (SCMG) is an association of physicians who practice in their own private offices located throughout San Diego County. Sharp Community Medical Group includes 222 primary care physicians and 826 specialists.

Sharp Rees-Stealy Medical Group
Sharp Rees-Stealy has 21 locations throughout San Diego County. The medical group has 592 physicians - 195 primary care physicians and 397 specialists that represent virtually every field of medicine.

Health plan

Sharp Health Plan 
Sharp Health Plan provides health insurance coverage for individuals, families, businesses and people with Medicare in San Diego County.

References

Hospital networks in the United States
Companies based in San Diego
Medical and health organizations based in California